Novak Tomić (Serbian Cyrillic: Новак Томић; 7 January 1936 – 23 July 2003) is a former Serbian football player. His nickname was Krca.

On the national level he played for Yugoslavia national team (5 matches), and was a participant at the 1958 FIFA World Cup.

Clubs 
 Red Star Belgrade (1954–1964)
 NK Hajduk Split (1964–1967)
 Los Angeles Toros (1967)
 San Diego Toros (1968)
 Racing Paris-Neuilly (1969–1970)

References

External links 
 NASL profile
 LA Times article
 Profile at reprezentacija.rs 

1936 births
2003 deaths
Footballers from Belgrade
Serbian footballers
Yugoslav footballers
Yugoslavia international footballers
1958 FIFA World Cup players
Red Star Belgrade footballers
HNK Hajduk Split players
Serbian expatriate footballers
Expatriate footballers in France
Expatriate soccer players in the United States
Yugoslav First League players
Ligue 2 players
National Professional Soccer League (1967) players
North American Soccer League (1968–1984) players
Los Angeles Toros players
San Diego Toros players

Association football defenders